Abohar Assembly constituency (Sl. No.: 81) is a Punjab Legislative Assembly constituency in Fazilka district, Punjab state, India. Abohar assembly constituency is one of the 117 seats of Punjab Vidhan Sabha. This constituency is located in Fazilka district of Punjab and comes under the Firozpur (Lok Sabha constituency) seat. 28% Hindu arora, 10% Jatt Sikh, 25% Dalit, 14% Kumhar Bagri, 10% Kamboj and 13% others lived there in this constituency.

Members of Legislative Assembly

Election results

2022

2017

References

External links
  

Assembly constituencies of Punjab, India
Fazilka district